Walter Donald Aloysius Signer (October 12, 1910 – July 23, 1974) was a Major League Baseball pitcher who played for the Chicago Cubs in 1943 and 1945.  The ,  right-hander was a native of New York City.

Signer is one of many ballplayers who only appeared in the major leagues during World War II.  He made his major league debut on September 18, 1943, starting the second game of a doubleheader  against the St. Louis Cardinals at Sportsman's Park.  Signer and the Cubs were shut out 5–0 by 29-year-old rookie Al Brazle.

Signer's first major league win came as a relief pitcher in an 8–7 victory over the Philadelphia Blue Jays at Wrigley Field (September 23, 1943).  His best game as a big leaguer was on October 1, 1943 when he pitched a complete game 3–1 win at home vs. the Boston Braves.

Two years later, in 1945, Signer pitched six games in relief for the Cubs with no starts. His career totals include 10 games pitched, 2 starts, a complete game, a 2–1 record with 3 games finished, a save, 11 earned runs allowed in 33 innings, and an earned run average of 3.00.

Signer died at the age of 63 in Greenwich, Connecticut.

References

External links

Major League Baseball pitchers
Chicago Cubs players
NYU Violets baseball players
1910 births
1974 deaths
Baseball players from New York City
Nashville Vols players
Allentown Brooks players
Burials at Gate of Heaven Cemetery (Hawthorne, New York)
Dayton Ducks players
Hazleton Mountaineers players
Louisville Colonels (minor league) players
St. Jean Braves players
York White Roses players